Park Yeong-jun (born 29 March 1965) is a South Korean athlete. He competed in the men's triple jump at the 1984 Summer Olympics and the 1988 Summer Olympics.

References

1965 births
Living people
Athletes (track and field) at the 1984 Summer Olympics
Athletes (track and field) at the 1988 Summer Olympics
South Korean male triple jumpers
Olympic athletes of South Korea
Place of birth missing (living people)
Asian Games medalists in athletics (track and field)
Asian Games silver medalists for South Korea
Asian Games bronze medalists for South Korea
Athletes (track and field) at the 1986 Asian Games
Medalists at the 1986 Asian Games
20th-century South Korean people